Joseph Adam Eugene Lekens (22 April 1911 – 13 September 1973) was a Belgian ice hockey player. He competed in the men's tournament at the 1936 Winter Olympics.

References

1911 births
1973 deaths
Ice hockey players at the 1936 Winter Olympics
Olympic ice hockey players of Belgium
Sportspeople from Antwerp
Ice hockey coaches
Belgian ice hockey forwards
Belgian ice hockey defencemen